Rant in E-Minor is an album by stand-up comedian and satirist Bill Hicks. Both this album and a similar album of new material, Arizona Bay, were released posthumously by Rykodisc on February 25, 1997, marking three years since Hicks' death.

The material on this album is darker and angrier in tone than some of his earlier work; Hicks can be heard screaming at his audience in between chapters, and very prominently during the track "You're Wrong Night".

On April 15, 2016, Comedy Dynamics released a new version of the album in both double CD and double vinyl LP formats called Rant in E-Minor: Variations. While the original album was culled from various performances and included musical interludes performed by Hicks, the new version presents a complete and uninterrupted performance recorded at the Laff Stop in Austin, Texas on October 24, 1993.

Track listing
Part One
Chapter One
1. "Fevered Egos" – 4:05
2. "Easter" – 1:19
3. "Gideons" – 1:05
Chapter Two
4. "People Suck" – 0:21
5. "Pro Life" – 4:13
6. "People Who Hate People" – 0:32
7. "Non-Smokers" – 2:39
8. "Gifts of Forgiveness" – 5:09
9. "Purple Vein Dick Joke" – 0:29
Chapter Three
10. "Confession Time (COPS)" – 4:25
11. "Wax Dart" – 0:30
12. "I'm Talking to the Women Here" – 1:10
Part Two
Chapter Four
13. "You're Wrong Night" – 5:37
Chapter Five
14. "A New Flag (Patriotism)" – 1:13
15. "Gays in the Military" – 2:24
16. "I.R.S. Bust" – 1:09
17. "Politics in America" – 0:39
18. "Quiet Loner" – 0:57
Chapter Six
19. "Artistic Roll Call" – 4:33
20. "Orange Drink" – 1:08
21. "Save Willie" – 1:30
Chapter Seven
22. "Deficit (Jesse Helms)" – 2:47
23. "Rush Limbaugh" – 2:21
Part Three
Chapter Eight
24. "Time to Evolve" – 3:16
Chapter Nine
25. "Waco (Koresh)" – 5:35
26. "The Pope" – 1:02
27. "Christianity" – 0:27
28. "Seven Seals" – 0:28
Chapter Ten
29. "One of the Boys (Clinton)" – 1:03
30. "Car Bomb Derby" – 0:26
31. "The Elite" – 1:06
Chapter Eleven
32. "Love List (No Future)" – 2:56
33. "Back to the Garden" – 1:20
34. "Your Children Aren't Special" – 3:13
35. "Wizards Have Landed" – 1:43
36. "Lift Me Lord" – 0:53

Rant in E-Minor: Variations

Personnel
Bill Hicks – guitar, vocals
Kevin Booth – bass, keyboards, percussion, producer

References

Bill Hicks albums
Live albums published posthumously
1997 live albums
Rykodisc live albums
1990s comedy albums
Live comedy albums
Spoken word albums by American artists
Stand-up comedy albums